ABCD: American-Born Confused Desi is a 2013 Indian Malayalam-language Black comedy film directed by Martin Prakkat, produced by Shibu Thameens under the banner of Thameens Films. It stars Dulquer Salmaan, Jacob Gregory, Tovino Thomas and Aparna Gopinath . The film features music composed by Gopi Sunder, cinematography is handled by Jomon T. John. The film deals about the journey of two young American Malayalees to Kerala. The title is based on the term American-Born Confused Desi. Released on 14 June 2013, the film received positive reviews and was commercially successful. It marked the first collaboration between Dulquer Salmaan and Martin Prakkat. The film was remade into Telugu in 2019 with the same name.

Plot
The story revolves around two spoiled youngsters who were born in the U.S.: Johns Isaac, and his cousin Korah Murikken. Johns is the son of a billionaire named Isaac Johns who is settled in New York, while Korah's mother left for Paris with her new husband. Johns and Korah enjoy their luxurious lives by driving expensive cars, going to pubs and night clubs, playing public pranks etc. Isaac decides to send both of them to India, saying that it is a vacation before Johns goes to Melbourne for his MBA studies the next month. However, he blocks Johns and Korah's credit cards post their arrival. Johns and Korah initially stay at a luxurious hotel apartment unaware that their credit cards are useless, but are soon aware of this fact and they try to escape from the apartment to avoid paying. However, they are caught by the security. The security guard brings them to the manager and he confiscates their mobile phones, tablets, and watches. Johns and Korah are given very poor accommodations with water from the nearby community dug well and a public toilet. They try to make money through underhand methods but are duped. With all of their money gone, they are left with no choice but to join MBA studies that Isaac arranged for them, along with 5k monthly for their combined expenses, only if they attend their classes regularly.

They befriend a student cum social worker Madhumitha from their college. Johns, out of romantic interest, takes part in Madhumita's social works and protests during which they get to know each other better. One of Madhumita's friend Seenamol, a journalist, publishes a fabricated article on Johns and Korah's poor upbringing and how they manage to survive on just 83 per day, which gains widespread popularity, making Johns and Korah overnight public figures. This triggers Akhilesh, the son of the late minister K.P Ravi Varma whose government claimed that 28 per day is enough to survive in the current economy. Johns and Korah's popularity is on the rise along with their frustration. Battling sociopolitical issues on their journey they realize one day that their only way to go back to the U.S. is by winning a competition called Youth Icon of the year and the prize money of 100,000. So, they participate in a protest which ends up in police baton charge. This raises their popularity and votes in the competition, much to the disappointment of Akhilesh, who is a candidate in the upcoming election. Seeing the duo's bravery, Naxalite representatives approach them and gives them a handgun seeking their support in future. Johns & Korah realize things are going out of hand and go AWOL, but later found to have taken refuge at Madhumita's house.

Madhumita loans them money to go back to US. However, Akhilesh tracks them down and confiscates their passports. Johns fights off Akhilesh but surrenders to law enforcement agencies. The ministry confirms in a press conference that Johns and Korah are not Indian citizens and are not legally allowed to involve in sociopolitical matters of India and are hence being deported. Now back in America, Johns and Korah returns Madhumita's loan while also expressing romantic interest her but Madhumita has other plans. As the movie ends, during the family prayer, an anonymous person arrives in front of the duo's house and shouts for revenge for one of Johns' earlier pranks. Johns and Korah escape from the back door.

Cast

 Dulquer Salmaan as Johns Isaac
 Jacob Gregory as Korah Murikken
 Tovino Thomas as Akhilesh Varma
 Aparna Gopinath as Madhumitha (Voiced by Angel Shijoy)
 Vijayaraghavan as K. P. Ravi Varma
 Lalu Alex as Dr. Isaac Johns
 Sajini Sachariah as Susan
 S. P. Sreekumar as Lloyd Fernandes
 Sijoy Varghese as Police Commissioner
Samson Matthew Valiyaparambil as College Professor
 Shivaji Guruvayoor as Vennala Gopalan
 Krishnabhaskar Mangalasserri as Professor
 Chembil Ashokan as Zachariya
 Dinesh Panicker as Shekhar Pillan (cameo appearance)
 Kalpana as Selinamma
 Nandhu as Kunjachan (Extended Cameo)
 Kalasala Babu as Chief Minister
 Thampi Antony as Thampi
 Kalabhavan Navas as Saji 
 Surabhi Lakshmi as Seenamol
 Anand as Pothen
 Abi Varghese as Johns and Korah's cousin
 Savannah Schechter as Johns Girlfriend (cameo appearance)
 Krishnaprasad as Rent a Car Manager (cameo appearance)
 Santhakumari as Colony Lady (cameo appearance)
Vinod Kedamangalam as Toddy Man (cameo appearance)
Molly Kannamaly as Old Lady (cameo appearance)

Production
The project was announced a few months before its shoot, acquiring the licence to shoot in the US delayed the commencement of the project. Initially many actresses were considered for the heroine including Isha Talwar, but theatre artist Aparna Gopinath was selected for the role in her debut film. Jacob Gregory, a mutual friend of Martin played the character of Korah. He himself showed interest in playing Korah and auditioned for the role. He had been part of the film from the scripting process itself.

Filming
The shooting was announced to start in March 2013 in U.S. New York City was the main location for the scenes shot in America. The original plan was to start the shooting of the film in the U.S. but that had to be changed after it became difficult to get the required permission and the visas. So the schedules were altered and the scenes in Kerala was wrapped up first. The college scenes were shot inside the Federal Institute of Science And Technology (FISAT), Angamaly. The filming of few 'montage cuts' for showing in between the songs were shot at the college.

Release
The film was released on 14 June 2013.

Critical reception

Unni R Nair of Kerala9 stated that the movie is a "confused mess to an extent" and was "not up to the mark", but gave 3.5 stars in a scale of 5. Sudheer Shah, writing for IndiaGlitz, awarded the movie 6.5 stars out of 10, concluding that "ABCD is one movie that must not be taken with any bit of seriousness." and that "If you have a few hours to laugh out for simple jokes that are not that intelligent, this is your movie." Shekhar of OneIndia gave the movie 3/5 stars, called the movie "a wonderful comedy entertainer, which has an interesting story" and said that "If you are comedy lover, don't miss to watch this film." Aswin J Kumar of The Times of India wrote that the movie is "watchable for the chemistry between Johns and Kora", giving it 3 stars. Rahul of Metro Matinee rated the movie as Entertaining, while stating that "it entertains in full throttle, asks the right questions and provides moments of emotional ecstasy and angst, all of which is part and parcel of a feel good movie." Paresh C Palicha of Rediff awarded the movie 2.5 stars, and wrote that the movie "is a showcase for Dulquer Salmaan; nothing more, nothing less."

Box office
The film became a commercial success. The film collected $48,711(₹36.31 lakhs) in three weeks from the United Kingdom box office. The film collected around ₹12.5 crore from Kerala box office. The film ran 101 days in theatres.

Soundtrack

The music of the film is from Gopi Sundar. The soundtrack features a remixed version of the song "Nayaapaisayilla" sung by Mehaboob for the 1960 film Neelisaali. This version is sung by Junior Mehaboob.

References

External links
 
 

2013 films
2010s Malayalam-language films
2013 comedy films
Indian comedy films
Malayalam films remade in other languages
Indian films set in New York City
Films about Indian Americans
Films scored by Gopi Sundar
Films shot in New York City
Films shot in Kochi
Films directed by Martin Prakkat
Comedy films about Asian Americans
2010s American films